The University of West Bohemia (ZČU) is a university in Plzeň, Czech Republic. It was founded in 1991 and consists of nine faculties.

History
The university was formed by the merger of the College of Mechanical and Electrical Engineering and the Faculty of Education in Plzeň. The College of Mechanical and Electrical Engineering was established in 1949 as a part of the Czech Technical University in Prague. It became an independent School in 1953. The Faculty of Electrical Engineering and the Faculty of Mechanical Engineering were formed in 1960. The Faculty of Applied Sciences and the Faculty of Economics were formed in 1990. The Faculty of Education was formed in 1948 as a Plzeň subsidiary of the Faculty of Education, Charles University in Prague. It became separate in 1953 as a College of Education and was later renamed as the Institute of Education. It became an independent Faculty of Education in 1964. Both Schools merged in 1991 as the University of West Bohemia.

Faculty of Law was established in 1993, The Faculty of Philosophy and Art in 2001, The Faculty of Art and Design in 2013 and The Faculty of Health Care Studies in 2008 when Private College in Plzeň merged with the university.

Organization

The faculties are the basic units of the university. The units implement their own academic programs. Departments and institutes are responsible for the delivery of courses and for conducting research.
The Faculty of Applied Sciences
The Faculty of Economics
The Faculty of Electrical Engineering
The Faculty of Philosophy and Arts
The Faculty of Education
The Faculty of Law
The Faculty of Mechanical Engineering
Ladislav Sutnar Faculty of Design and Art
The Faculty of Health Care Studies
Institute of Applied Language Studies
New Technologies - Research Centre in the West Bohemia region

Rectors of ZČU
doc. RNDr. Jiří Holenda, CSc. (1992–1998)
prof. Ing. Zdeněk Vostracký, DrSc.(1998–2004)
doc. Ing. Josef Průša, CSc. (2004–2011)
doc. PaedDr. Ilona Mauritzová, Ph.D. (2011-2015)
doc. Dr. RNDr. Miroslav Holeček (since 2015)

Notable faculty
Justin Quinn, Irish
Brad Vice, English

References

External links
University of West Bohemia Website 
Center of Computer Graphics and Visualization

 
Universities in the Czech Republic
Educational institutions established in 1991
University of West Bohemia (Plzen, 1993)
1991 establishments in Czechoslovakia